James Blake Rogers (July 25, 1915 – April 28, 2000) was an actor. He played Hopalong Cassidy's sidekick in six films. Rogers was also a horse rancher, polo player, and newspaperman. He was the family representative on the Will Rogers Memorial Commission, and worked with the staff at the Will Rogers State Historic Park.

Early years
Rogers was born in New York City on July 25, 1915, the son of Will Rogers and Betty Blake. He had three siblings: Will Jr. (1911–1993), Mary (1913–1989), and Fred (1918–1920). He spent his childhood in Beverly Hills, but moved to a ranch in the late 1920s, and grew to love working with horses.  He attended Pomona College, but left in 1935, after his father and pilot Wiley Post died in a plane crash.

Film career
As a child he had parts in four of his father's silent films, and was billed as Jimmy Rogers. He used that stage name in all of his film roles. Rogers was more interested in raising horses, so in the 1930s he and a friend purchased a ranch in Santa Barbara County, but in the early 1940s the U. S. government bought the ranch for a new army base, which later became Vandenberg Air Force Base.

In need of a new occupation he returned to acting. He made three comedy westerns with Noah Beery Jr. at Hal Roach Studios. Rogers then went on to make six Hopalong Cassidy movies with William Boyd, playing a fictional version of himself, a character named Jimmy Rogers.

Later work
During the later part of World War II Rogers joined the Marine Corps and worked as a writer and correspondent. After the war he and his brother Will Rogers Jr. ran The Beverly Hills Citizen, a newspaper that was published between 1955 and 1962.

He appeared in documentaries about his father's life, includingThe Story of Will Rogers, a 1961 episode of the television documentary Project Twenty, which was narrated by Bob Hope, and Will Rogers, a 2001 episode of California’s Gold, which aired after Rogers’ death.

Rogers was the family representative on the Will Rogers Memorial Commission, and worked with the staff at the Will Rogers State Historic Park. Michelle Lefebvre-Carter, the director of the Memorial Commission stated: "Jim Rogers referred to Will Rogers affectionately as 'Dad' in family matters and 'WR' in reference to the icon."

Rogers owned a California ranch, where he trained horses and operated a riding school. He attended western fan conventions, and talked about his movie career.

Personal life
Rogers married Astrea Kemmler on March 26, 1938, and they had three children – James Kemmler Rogers, Charles Edward Rogers, and Astrea Elizabeth Rogers Brandon. His first wife died on November 19, 1987. He married Judith Braun on August 31, 1995. Rogers died of cancer on April 28, 2000.

Filmography
   1920   Water, Water, Everywhere – uncredited bit role
   1920   The Strange Boarder – Billy Gardner
   1920   Jes' Call Me Jim – Harry Benedict 
   1921   Doubling for Romeo – Jimmie Jones
   1942   Dudes Are Pretty People – Jimmy
   1943   Calaboose – Jimmy
   1943   Prairie Chickens – Jimmy
   1943   False Colors – Jimmy Rogers
   1943   Riders of the Deadline – Jimmy Rogers
   1944   Texas Masquerade – Jimmy Rogers
   1944   Lumberjack – Jimmy Rogers
   1944   Mystery Man – Jimmy Rogers
   1944   Forty Thieves – Jimmy Rogers

References

1915 births
2000 deaths
20th-century American male actors
Cherokee Nation artists
Male actors from New York City
Military personnel from New York City
Pomona College alumni
20th-century Native Americans
Deaths from cancer in California